Elmar Magerramov (born April 10, 1958 in Baku, Azerbaijan) is an international chess Grandmaster.

In 1991, he shared first place in the last USSR Chess Championship held, with Artashes Minasian, losing the title on tiebreaks. In 1992, Magerramov became the first chess Grandmaster in the history of Azerbaijan.

He has played with Kasparov several training matches and tournament games with an overall score of + 4 - 8 = 7.

Along with his playing career, Elmar had an extensive coaching career as well. He has been National Team Coach of Tunis, coached Garry Kasparov during 1984 World Chess Championship and Maia Chiburdanidze during 1991 Women's Chess World Championship.

Magerramov is currently living in UAE. He is married and has two sons. His main hobbies apart from chess are mathematics and music. He plays on the Internet Chess Club (ICC) under the pseudonym "El-Marmalade".

The ninth chapter of Tibor Karolyi's 2009 book Genius in the Background is devoted to him.

References

Further reading

External links
 
 

1958 births
Living people
Chess grandmasters
Chess coaches
National team coaches
Soviet chess players
Azerbaijani chess players
Azerbaijani expatriates in the United Arab Emirates